The year 1625 in music involved some significant events.

Events
Jacques Gaultier becomes a musician at the court of King Charles I of England.

Publications 
Agostino Agazzari – Eucharisticum melos..., Op. 20 (Rome: Luca Antonio Soldi)
Adriano Banchieri
 (The musical Syrinx) (Bologna: Girolamo Mascheroni)
 (The beginning child) for two voices, Op. 46 (Venice: Bartolomeo Magni for Gardano), a collection of musical exercises for young singers
Manuel Cardoso – First book of masses for four, five, and six voices (Lisbon: Pedro Craesbeck)
Melchior Franck
 for five voices (Coburg: Johann Forckel for Salomon Gruner), a collection of intradas
 for six voices (Coburg: Johann Forckel), a wedding motet for the jurist Johann Bechstedt
 for six voices (Coburg: Johann Forckel), a wedding motet
Pietro Pace - The eleventh book of motets..., Op. 25 (Rome, Giovanni Battista Robletti), prepared posthumously by his son, Benedetto Pace
Giovanni Picchi –  for two, three, four, six, and eight voices with basso continuo (Venice: Alessandro Vincenti)
Hieronymus Praetorius –  for five, six, seven, eight, ten, and fifteen voices, Op. 5 (Hamburg: Michael Hering)

Classical music 
Alessandro Grandi – O quam tu pulchra es, a concertato motet

Opera
Francesca Caccini – La liberazione di Ruggiero

Births
December 24 – Johann Rudolph Ahle, organist and composer (d. 1673)

Deaths
January 7 – Ruggiero Giovannelli, Italian composer (born c.1560)
June 5 – Orlando Gibbons, composer (born 1583)
July 5 – Cornelis Verdonck, composer (born 1563)
October 1 – Hendrik Speuy, organist and composer (born c.1575)
November 3 – Adam Gumpelzhaimer, composer and music theorist (born 1559) 
date unknown – Muthu Thandavar, Carnatic composer (born 1525)
probable – Paul Peuerl, organist, organ builder and composer (born 1570)

References